Filipe Baravilala (born  25 November 1994) is a Fijian footballer, Who is playing for Suva F.C., He represented Fiji in the football competition at the 2016 Summer Olympics.

References

External links

Fiji international footballers
1994 births
Living people
Footballers at the 2016 Summer Olympics
Olympic footballers of Fiji
Fijian footballers
Association football defenders